Ana Acosta (born 4 July 1961) is an Argentine actress and comedian.

Biography
Ana Acosta was born in Buenos Aires on 4 July 1961, to a family of Canarian descent. She appeared on the program until 1993, receiving the Martín Fierro Award for artistic revelation in 1991.

She subsequently appeared in numerous plays, including the one-woman shows Cómo se rellena un bikini salvaje and My Brilliant Divorce. She received ACE and Sea Star Awards for her performance in the former.

Her mother, also named Ana, died in 2015.

In January 2021, Acosta appeared together with her daughter Talía in Casa Matriz. Acosta had previously played the part of the daughter in a 1993 production.

Works

Theater

Awards
 1991: Martín Fierro Award for artistic revelation for her work on Peor es nada
 1995: ACE Award for the play Cómo rellenar una bikini salvaje
 1996: Sea Star Award for best female lead performance, for the play Cómo rellenar una bikini salvaje (which also received the award for best one-person show)

References

External links
 

1961 births
Argentine film actresses
Argentine musical theatre actresses
Argentine television actresses
Argentine women comedians
Living people